Colborne Lodge is a historic house museum located in an 1836 home in Toronto's High Park. John George Howard, an architect, engineer and prominent Toronto citizen, built this house, which became the property of the city following his death in 1890.

History

Built in 1836 by City Surveyor John George Howard to house himself and his wife, Jemima Frances Meikle, Colborne Lodge is perched on the top of a hill overlooking Lake Ontario. The home is a classic example of the Regency cottage style, and it was one of the first such buildings in area. The small house sought to blend in with the landscape around it, in sharp contrast to the rigid formalism of Georgian architecture that was then the standard architectural style. It was originally one storey, but Howard later expanded it by adding the upper level.

The house was named after Sir John Colborne, Lieutenant-Governor of Upper Canada from 1828 to 1836 and the first Canadian patron of Howard's architecture. Next to the home is the Colborne Lodge gardens, first created by the Howards.

His original intent was to start a farm on the property, and he did keep some animals. Later, he attempted to subdivide his holdings and sell off small lots to create a new neighbourhood. At that time, the area was still a considerable distance west of Toronto and a difficult commute to town. Howard himself maintained a separate home in downtown Toronto. The landscape of the property – with its steep hills, wetlands and sandy soils – would have been difficult to develop in any event.

Howard and his wife had no children and thus deeded the property to the city in 1873, in exchange for a permanent pension. He continued to live in the house until his death in 1890. Additional land was purchased by the city in 1873 and 1930, thereby expanding the park to the current .

Howard and his wife are buried in the Howard Tomb, a stone monument which overlooks Grenadier Pond. The cairn was designed by Howard, and the fence gate for the cairn was originally from St Paul's Cathedral in London and had been designed by the famous architect Christopher Wren. It dates from 1714, and Howard had it shipped from London in 1875.

The building is now a museum run by the City of Toronto. The museum displays the house and furnishings of the 1800s, using much of the Howards' own furnishings and artworks. The museum holds an annual Harvest Festival, plus summer and March break camps for children. Annually at Hallowe'en, guides put on a "Haunted Walk" that discusses legends of ghost appearances at the Lodge.

See also
List of museums in Toronto
List of oldest buildings and structures in Toronto

References
Cruikshank, Tom. Old Toronto Houses. Toronto: Firefly Books, 2003.
Denby William and William Kilbourn. Toronto Observed. Toronto: Oxford University Press, 1986.

External links

 Colborne Lodge

Houses in Toronto
Museums in Toronto
Historic house museums in Ontario
Regency architecture in Canada